Auchenionchus crinitus is a species of labrisomid blenny endemic to the Pacific waters off of Chile.

References

crinitus
Fish described in 1841